Fernando Silva may refer to:

Fernando Silva (badminton) (born 1972), Portuguese badminton player
Fernando Silva (chess player) (born 1950), Portuguese chess champion in 1975–77, '81 and '87
Fernando Silva (footballer, born 1977), Andorran football striker
Fernando Silva (footballer, born 1980), Portuguese football central defender
Fernando Silva (footballer, born 1991), Brazilian football winger
Fernando Silva (distance runner) (born 1980), Portuguese distance runner
Fernando Silva (sprinter) (born 1952), Portuguese sprint athlete
Fernando Silva (swimmer) (born 1986), Brazilian swimmer
Fernando Da Silva (1920–2012), Brazilian artist/illustrator
Fernando da Silva Cabrita (1923–2014), Portuguese football forward and manager
Fernándo de Silva (fl. 1600s), Spanish Governor of the Philippines from 1625 to 1626
Fernando de Silva, 12th Duke of Alba (1714–1776), Duke of Huéscar, Spanish politician and general
Fernando Paixão da Silva (born 1988), Brazilian football midfielder
Fernando Silva Santisteban (1929–2006), Peruvian historian, anthropologist and professor

See also
Silva, Portuguese-language surname